Deep Creek Township may refer to the following townships in the United States:

 Deep Creek Township, Clinton County, Iowa
 Deep Creek Township, Yadkin County, North Carolina